Jimmy Cliff is a 1969 album by Jimmy Cliff. It was retitled Wonderful World, Beautiful People after the track of that name was released as a single in the U.S. Richard Polak, who is credited with the sleeves of a number of Island Records artists in the early 1970s, is credited with photography.

Track listing

References

External links

1969 albums
Jimmy Cliff albums
A&M Records albums
Trojan Records albums
Albums arranged by Larry Fallon
Albums produced by Larry Fallon
Albums produced by Leslie Kong